Weinman is a surname. Notable people with the surname include:

 Adolph Alexander Weinman (1870–1952), German-born American sculptor
 Aubrey Weinman (1897–1967), Sri Lankan military officer
 Ben Weinman (born 1975), American musician
 Ben-Zion Weinman, known more commonly as Ben-Zion (1897–1987), Russia–Jewish American painter
Carl Andrew Weinman (1903–1979), American judge
 J. R. Weinman, Sri Lankan lawyer
 John Weinman, British psychologist
 Lynda Weinman (born 1955), American business owner, computer instructor, and author
 Robert Weinman (1915–2003), American sculptor 
 Sarah Weinman, writer

See also 
 Wainman, surname
 Weinmann, surname
 Wineman, surname